Tordylium trachycarpum is a species of flowering plant in the family Apiaceae, native to Western Asia and European Turkey. It was first described by Pierre Edmond Boissier in 1849 as Ainsworthia trachycarpa.

References

Apioideae
Flora of European Turkey
Flora of Western Asia
Plants described in 1849